Netherlands competed at the 2011 World Aquatics Championships in Shanghai, China between July 16 and 31, 2011.

Medalists

Diving

Netherlands has qualified 3 athletes in diving.

Men

Women

Open water swimming

Women

Swimming

Netherlands qualified 15 swimmers.

Men

Women

 * raced in heats only

Synchronised swimming

Netherlands has qualified 11 athletes in synchronised swimming.

Women

Reserves
Christina Maat

Water polo

Women

Team Roster

Ilse van der Meijden
Yasemin Smit – Captain
Mieke Cabout
Biurakn Hakhverdian
Sabrina van der Sloot
Nomi Stomphorst
Iefke van Belkum
Robbin Remers
Jantien Cabout
Nienke Vermeer
Lieke Klaassen
Simone Koot
Anne Heinis

Group A

Playoff round

Quarterfinals

Classification 5–8

Seventh place game

References

Nations at the 2011 World Aquatics Championships
2011 in Dutch sport
Netherlands at the World Aquatics Championships